Kidi may refer to:

 Kidi (film), a 2017 Indian Kannada action thriller
 Kidi, Tangestan, Iran, a village
 KiDi, stage name of Ghanaian singer/songwriter Dennis Nana Dwamena (born 1993)
 Kidi Bebey, French journalist and author
 KIDI-FM, an FM radio station licensed to Lompoc, California, United States
 KIDI-FM, former call sign of KRTO, an FM radio station licensed to Santa Maria, California
 Kidi, a type of drum used in Ewe drumming